"One Way or Another" is a song by Blondie, later covered by One Direction as "One Way or Another (Teenage Kicks)".

One Way or Another may also refer to:

One Way...Or Another, Cactus album
 "One Way or Another" (Uriah Heep song)
 One Way or Another Productions, a New York based production company whose credits include Uptown
 One Way or Another (TV series), a Spanish television series (original title: Por H o por B)
 De Cierta Manera (One Way or Another), a 1974 Cuban romantic drama film by Sara Gómez